Muhamad Hosni Muhamad (born 15 February 1972) is a Singaporean track coach and former track and field sprinter who specialised in the 100 metres. He represented Singapore in athletics at the 1993 Southeast Asian Games, the 1994 Asian Games and the 1994 Commonwealth Games, where he was the flag bearer for the Singapore contingent. Hosni retired from competitive running in 1997.

Professional athletics career

Personal Bests

Competitions

Awards 

 Team of the Year - Singapore Armed Forces Sports Association (SAFSA): 1994
 Sportsman of the Year -  Singapore Armed Forces Sports Association (SAFSA): 1994
 Coca Cola / The Sunday Times Sports Stars Monthly Awards: May 1994
 Singapore National Olympic Committee - Meritorious Award: 1993 
 Singapore Amateur Athletics Association Most Outstanding Athlete Award: 1992
 Coca Cola / The Sunday Times Sports Stars Monthly Awards: August 1992

Post-competitive career 
After his competition career, Hosni moved into coaching part-time before making the switch to full-time coaching in 2016.

Coaching Awards 
 Singapore Coach Medallion - High Performance Coach Category: 2019

References 

1972 births
Living people
Singaporean male sprinters
Athletes (track and field) at the 1994 Commonwealth Games
Commonwealth Games competitors for Singapore
Athletes (track and field) at the 1994 Asian Games
Asian Games competitors for Singapore
Competitors at the 1993 Southeast Asian Games
Southeast Asian Games bronze medalists for Singapore
Southeast Asian Games medalists in athletics